Reconstruction  is the twelfth studio album by South African jazz trumpeter Hugh Masekela released via Chisa Records label in July 1970. The album was re-released on CD in 1994 via MoJazz label.

Track listing

Personnel
Arranged by – Hugh Masekela (tracks: 5 6 7 8 9), Wayne Henderson (tracks: 3)
Bass – Hal Dodson (tracks: 6), Monk Montgomery (tracks: 1, 2, 5, 7, 8, 10), Wilton Felder (tracks: 1 3 4 5 6 7 8 9)
Congas – Francisco Aguabella (tracks: 1 3 4 5 7  8 9)
Design, photography – Barry Feinstein, Camouflage Productions, Tom Wilkes
Directed by – Stewart Levine
Drums – Al Foster (tracks: 1 2 5 6 7 8 10), Wayne Henderson (tracks: 1 3 4 5 7 8 9)
Electric piano – Joseph Sample (tracks: 1 3 4 5 7 8 9)
Engineer – Larry Cox, Rik Pekkonen
Guitar – Arthur Adams (tracks: 1 2 3 4 5 7 8 9 10), Bruce Langhorne (tracks: 3 4 9)
Orchestrated by – Dale Frank (tracks: 1 10), Frank Kavelin (tracks: 2 4)
Piano – Larry Willis
Vocals – Caiphus Semenya (tracks: 1 5 7 9), Larry Willis (tracks: 6), Letta Mbulu (tracks: 1 5 7 8), Philemon Hou (tracks: 1 5 7 8)

References

External links

1969 albums
Uni Records albums
Hugh Masekela albums
Albums produced by Stewart Levine